The 1988 Intercontinental Cup was an Association football match played on 11 December 1988 between Nacional of Uruguay, winners of the 1988 Copa Libertadores, and PSV of Netherlands, winners of the 1987–88 European Cup. The match was played at the neutral venue of the National Stadium in Tokyo in front of 62,000 fans. Santiago Ostolaza was named as man of the match.

Match details

|valign="top" width="50%"|

|}
Assistant Referees: 
  Kil Ki-Chul (South Korea)
  Masahiro Sogawa (Japan)

See also
1987–88 European Cup
1988 Copa Libertadores
PSV Eindhoven in European football

References

External links
FIFA Article

 

1988–89 in European football
1988 in South American football
1988 in Japanese football
1988
1988
Club Nacional de Football matches
PSV Eindhoven matches
Association football penalty shoot-outs
1988 in Uruguayan football
1988–89 in Dutch football
Sports competitions in Tokyo
December 1988 sports events in Asia
1988 in Tokyo
1988 in association football